Chris Moyles' Quiz Night is a British television comedy panel game show, presented by Chris Moyles.

The show was originally shown on Channel 4 at 10 p.m. on Sundays and repeated on Mondays at 11 p.m. It included three rounds in which he took on three celebrity contestants in a quiz where the prize was an item from his own home. As he was also competing (in order to keep the prize), the questions were asked by a celebrity quiz master. The series has an all-female house band present in the studio who played the title music.

Episode guide

Series 1

Abbey Clancy was crowned the winner of series 1.

Series 2
The show returned on 26 February 2010 for a seven-episode run. There are no more guest quizmasters, however there are regular appearances every episode by certain celebrity quizzers such as Ozzy Osbourne and Peter Crouch.

James Corden was crowned series champion after beating Dale Winton, Peter Andre and host Chris Moyles.

Series 3
A third series returned on 1 November 2010. A Christmas special aired on 22 December 2010, having been filmed two months earlier.
 

Paddy McGuinness was crowned series champion after beating Kelly Osbourne, Pamela Anderson and host Chris Moyles.

Series 4

Olly Murs was crowned series champion after beating Paddy McGuinness, Chris Tarrant and host Chris Moyles.
Vernon Kay was supposed to be on the show but couldn't make it due to rehearsals for Family Fortunes.

Series 5
Series 5 started on 23 November 2011 proceeding a Hollywood Stars Quiz Night special that aired on 23 October 2011.

Alesha Dixon was crowned series champion after beating John Barrowman, JLS (standing in for Olly Murs) and host Chris Moyles.

International versions 
The TV format was exported in Spain, with the title Mucho que perder, poco que ganar when it was aired on La Sexta and hosted by Anabel Alonso on 2011.

References

External links

Channel 4 game shows
2000s British comedy television series
2010s British comedy television series
2009 British television series debuts
2012 British television series endings
English-language television shows
2000s British game shows
2010s British game shows